Anzhelika Rublevska Tahir (born 5 January 1994) is a Pakistani-Ukrainian model and Lollywood actress. She was the winner of Miss Pakistan World 2015 and was sent to Miss Earth 2016 to represent Pakistan. In 2016, she entered the Pakistani film industry.

Career

Beauty pageants

Tahir was born in Kyiv, Ukraine to a Pakistani father and a Ukrainian mother. Her father was from Sheikupura, in Punjab, Pakistan. She is the first Pakistani of mixed descent to win the title of Miss Pakistan World. She grew up in Ukraine. After graduating from the Lyceum, she began studies Fashion design at the Kyiv National University of Technologies and Design.

Tahir won Miss Pakistan World 2015 on 31 October 2015 in Toronto, Canada. She also won Miss Perfect and Miss Popularity. She then went to compete in World Miss University and was second runner-up. She went to Korea to compete in Miss Supertalent 2016 and was second runner-up again. Tahir then competed in Miss Earth 2016 2016 and won gold medal for the talent round. She went on to compete in Miss Eco International 2017 in Cairo, Egypt and was first runner-up and finally competed in Face of the Universe and was second runner-up.

Acting 
Tahir was in a Lollywood movie, Na Band Na Baraati, which starred Mikaal Zulfiqar, Ali Kazmi and Qavi Khan. This was her first movie in Pakistan's film industry and she has signed her next film to be shot in Dubai.

Tahir, became the second Pakistani actress and pageant queen to walk the red carpet at the 2018 Cannes Film Festival, as the Brand Ambassador of Miss Pakistan World.

Filmography

Discography

References

External links
Miss Pakistan World Miss Pakistan World 
 Miss Pakistan World Facebook Page

Pakistani beauty pageant winners
Pakistani women
Living people
Miss Earth 2016 contestants
Ukrainian people of Punjabi descent
1997 births
Ukrainian people of Pakistani descent